Fourtet may refer to

Clos Fourtet, a Bordeaux Saint-Émilion wine producer
Four Tet, the stage name of electronic musician Kieran Hebden